The Minister of Police was the leader and most senior official of the French Ministry of Police. It was a position in the Government of France from 1796 to 1818 and briefly from 1852 to 1853.

History 
The office was created on 2 January 1796 by taking police powers away from the Minister of Interior and giving them to the new Minister of Police. The move was motivated by an apparent overload of the Interior department. The first minister, Philippe-Antoine Merlin, was appointed two days later, as Armand-Gaston Camus refused the office. The most famous minister was Joseph Fouché, whose service spanned over a decade.

It was a major French ministerial position under the Directory, Consulate, First Empire, and Restored Bourbon Dynasty. The position was merged into the Ministry of Interior in 1818, although it was briefly restored by Napoleon III in 1852.

Powers and functions

Officeholders

First Republic

First Empire

Restoration

Hundred Days

Kingdom of France

Second Republic

Notes

References 

Police
Defunct law enforcement agencies of France